Claude Bouchard (born 1939) is Professor and the John W. Barton, Sr. Endowed Chair in Genetics and Nutrition at Louisiana State University's Pennington Biomedical Research Center (PBRC), where he is also the Director of the Human Genomics Laboratory. He is known for his research on the role of genetics in obesity and in the process of adaptation to regular physical activity. He was president of the Obesity Society in 1991–92.

Biography
Born in 1939 in Quebec City, Quebec, Canada, Bouchard graduated from Laval University with a B.P.Ed degree in 1962. He received his M.Sc. in exercise physiology from the University of Oregon the following year before doing postgraduate work at the University of Cologne and the German Sport University Cologne in Germany for two years (1963–65). In 1977, he received his Ph.D. from the University of Texas at Austin, after which he completed his postdoc at the University of Montreal in the same year. In 1999, after teaching kinesiology at Laval University for over thirty years, he joined the faculty of the Pennington Biomedical Research Center, where he was the Executive Director and George A. Bray Chair in Nutrition until 2010.

Honors and awards
Bouchard has been a fellow of the Royal Academy of Medicine of Belgium since 1996. He became an Officer of the Order of Leopold II of Belgium in 1994, a member of the Order of Canada in 2001, and a Chevalier in the Ordre National du Quebec in 2005. In 2002, he received the Honor Award from the American College of Sports Medicine. He is a fellow of the American College of Sports Medicine, the American Society for Nutrition, the Obesity Society, the American Heart Association, and the American Association for the Advancement of Science. In 2016, the Louisiana State University (LSU) Board of Supervisors voted unanimously to award him a Boyd Professorship, the most prestigious title that can be awarded to professors at LSU.

References

External links
Faculty page at PBRC website

Living people
1939 births
Obesity researchers
People from Quebec City
Université Laval alumni
Exercise physiologists
Louisiana State University faculty
University of Oregon alumni
University of Texas at Austin College of Education alumni
Academic staff of Université Laval
Officers of the Order of Leopold II
Members of the Order of Canada
Members of the National Order of Quebec
Fellows of the American Association for the Advancement of Science
Canadian physiologists